is a  fantasy-themed fighting game produced by Sega based on their Golden Axe series. It was originally released as a coin-operated arcade game in 1995 and later ported to the Sega Saturn. It is the third coin-operated installment in the series, following the original Golden Axe and Golden Axe: The Revenge of Death Adder.

Plot
Many years after the last war with Death Adder, the magical axe which Gillius Thunderhead used to slay Death Adder is rediscovered. Over time, the powers of the axe have grown. Numerous warriors fight to obtain the powerful axe.

Development

The game was unveiled at the 1995 Amusement Operators' Union (AOU) show in Tokyo.

Reception

Golden Axe: The Duel received middling reviews from critics. Reviewing the Saturn version, Maximum judged the game to be decent in both playability and graphics, but highly criticized the lack of originality, and complained that the potion-dropping imp mechanic makes executing super moves overly convoluted. They summarized the game as "a clear example of competent programmers coding up a lacking concept". Tom Guise of Sega Saturn Magazine praised the "arcade exact" conversion, the potion-dropping imp mechanic, the impressive graphics, and the music, but felt that the game was "outclassed" by the imminent ports of Virtua Fighter 2 and X-Men: Children of the Atom. The four reviewers of Electronic Gaming Monthly also praised the potion-dropping imp mechanic, but felt that the game simply did not stand out from previous 2D fighters, and that in particular its visuals were overly similar to Samurai Shodown. GamePro said it was "a lame fighting game at its best", citing the dull moves, absence of combos, and the difficulty in getting the moves to work. A reviewer for Next Generation called it "solid, if uninspired". He elaborated that the animation, graphics, control interface, and special moves hold up to the best fighting games released during the 16-bit era, which simultaneously places it as both a generation out-of-date and a recommended title for fans of old 2D fighting games.

References

External links

Golden Axe: The Duel at Gaming History

1995 video games
Arcade video games
Fantasy video games
Sega arcade games
Sega video games
Sega Saturn games
Fighting games
Golden Axe
Video games developed in Japan